Northeast Los Angeles (abbreviated NELA) is a  region of Los Angeles County, comprising seven neighborhoods within the City of Los Angeles. The area is home to Occidental College located in Eagle Rock.

History
The bulk of the area closer to Pueblo de Los Angeles-Downtown Los Angeles was part of the original Spanish and Mexican land grants of Rancho San Rafael and Rancho San Pascual when the city incorporated in 1850. One of the first annexations of the city was Highland Park in 1895. Other nearby communities attached to Los Angeles were Garvanza (1899), Arroyo Seco (1912) and Eagle Rock (1923). Development in the Northeast was fostered by service of the Los Angeles Railway "Yellow Cars."

Traditionally a heavily Latino and working-class part of the city, Northeast Los Angeles has undergone gentrification starting in the 2000s. With the influx of young professionals, Northeast Los Angeles has gained attention for its hipster culture and a new wave of commercial development; however, increasing housing prices have caused tensions with long-time residents.

Geography 
According to the Mapping L.A. survey of the Los Angeles Times, Northeast Los Angeles consists of a  region bounded on the south and west by the Interstate 5, the north by the cities of Glendale and Pasadena, and bounded on the east by the Arroyo Seco Parkway. Much of Northeast Los Angeles is located on or around the San Rafael Hills. 

The same survey identifies the following seven neighborhoods as comprising Northeast Los Angeles:

 Atwater Village
 Cypress Park
 Eagle Rock
 Montecito Heights
 Glassell Park
 Highland Park
 Mount Washington

Other neighborhoods within the region are:

Arroyo Seco
Elysian Valley
Garvanza
Heritage Square
Hermon

Population

2017 City of Los Angeles data 
According to the 2013-2017 American Community Survey and the City of Los Angeles Department of City Planning, Northeast Los Angeles had 243,925 residents. The racial and ethnic breakdown was Latino, 64%, White, 16.7%, Asian, 16.5%; Black, 1.8%, Native American 0.5%, Pacific Islander 0.4%, and Other, 0.8%.

The area has a relatively large immigrant community, with approximately 38% of the population being foreign-born.

2000 census 
In the 2000 census, Northeast Los Angeles had 167,674 residents in its 17.18 square miles, which amounted to 9,757 people per square mile. The densest neighborhood was Highland Park, and the least dense was Mount Washington.

About 54% of the area's population lived in rental units, while 46% lived in owner-occupied housing. Highland Park was the neighborhood with the highest rental occupancy, and Eagle Rock had the lowest.  The latter district also had the oldest population, and Cypress Park had the youngest. Eagle Rock also was the wealthiest neighborhood and Cypress Park the poorest. Eagle Rock was the neighborhood with the largest percentage of residents holding a four-year academic degree and Cypress Park had the lowest percentage.

The ethnic breakdown in 2000 was Latino, 62.5%, White, 16.6%, Asian, 16.0%; Black, 2.0%, and Other, 2.9%. Eagle Rock was the most ethnically diverse neighborhood and Cypress Park the least.

Transportation
The area is well-served by freeways and public transportation.  California's first freeway, the 1940 Arroyo Seco Parkway (SR 110), connects the area with Downtown and Pasadena. Interstate 5 (the Golden State Freeway) and Interstate 10 (the San Bernardino Freeway) lie directly to the south of the district.

The Metro L Line light rail's four stations (Lincoln/Cypress, Heritage Square, Southwest Museum, and Highland Park) connect Northeast Los Angeles with Downtown and Pasadena.

See also

Notable places 
Arroyo Seco River
California Cycleway
Occidental College
Southwest Museum of the American Indian
Heritage Square Museum
List of Los Angeles Historic-Cultural Monuments on the East and Northeast Sides

Notable people 
John C. Holland, Los Angeles City Council member, 1943–67, businessman in Northeast Los Angeles
Jackson Browne, singer, songwriter, and musician who wrote and recorded songs such as "These Days", "The Pretender", "Running on Empty".
Skrillex (Sonny Moore), electronic music/songwriter, 1988–present
Beck (Beck Hansen), alternative singer/musician
Billie Eilish , Academy Award & Grammy Award winning singer/songwriter.
Edward Furlong actor, "Terminator 2:Judgment Day"

Other regions of Los Angeles County 

 Angeles National Forest
 Antelope Valley
 Central Los Angeles
 Eastside
 Harbor
 Northwest County
 Pomona Valley
 San Fernando Valley
 San Gabriel Valley
 South Bay
 Santa Monica Mountains
 South Los Angeles
 Southeast County
 Verdugos
 Westside

References

External links
 Boulevard Sentinel

 
Neighborhoods in Los Angeles